Lauben is a municipality in the district of Oberallgäu in Bavaria in Germany.

References

Oberallgäu